Falafel Cart is a 2019 animated family short drama film produced by RoyalTales and directed by Abdullah Al-Wazzan with an original score by Dan Phillipson and sound design by Andrew Vernon. The short blends stop motion animation with traditional and some computer animation. In 2019, the film was submitted for the 2020 Academy Award for Best Animated Short Film making it Kuwait's first short film to ever be submitted to the Academy Awards. In 2020 The film earned an official selection at the Hiroshima International Animation Festival in the best of the world program. In 2021 the film won best animated short at the Burbank International Film Festival. In 2019 the film won best international short film at the Los Angeles Animation Festival.

Plot 
During a stormy night, an immigrant falafel vendor who lives in his cart in the middle of nowhere stumbles upon a mysterious flower. The extraordinary encounter sparks something within him and eventually makes him relive scenes from his past life.

Production 
The film was inspired by the ongoing conflicts in the Middle East, highlighting the impact on people who are merely seeking a better life. The project first came to life after Al-Wazzan started to experiment with a different form of animation that employed a combination of stop-motion, computer generated animation, claymation and traditional animation. The filmmaker single-handedly animated the entire film, built and painted hundreds of models, puppets and backgrounds in a span of three years in order to achieve a distinct world for the film.

Release 
Falafel Cart first premiered theatrically in Los Angeles, California on September 13, 2019. The film then began its festival run at the Los Angeles Animation Festival on December 8, 2019 where it won Best International Short Film. In 2021 ShortTV obtained non exclusive distribution rights to the film for release on its live channels and streaming platforms. On September 11, 2021 the film screened at AMC Theatres in Burbank as part of the Burbank International Film Festival.

Accolades 
The film received the following awards and nominations:

References

External links 
 
 

Kuwaiti short films
English-language Kuwaiti films
2019 short films
2019 animated films
2019 films
Films about refugees
2019 war drama films
2010s fantasy drama films
2010s English-language films